Tabadkan may refer to:
 Tabadakan, a village in Razavi Khorasan Province
 Tabadkan Rural District, an administrative subdivision of Razavi Khorasan Province